1240 Cocoanut Road (formerly known as the Dickenson House) is a historic house located at 1240 Cocoanut Road in Boca Raton, Florida. It is locally significant for its association with Maurice Fatio, a master architect with an office in Palm Beach.

Description and history 
The two-story Colonial Revival style house was designed by architect Maurice Fatio. The house was added to the National Register of Historic Places on August 17, 2001.

References

External links
 Palm Beach County listings at National Register of Historic Places

Houses on the National Register of Historic Places in Florida
National Register of Historic Places in Palm Beach County, Florida
Houses in Palm Beach County, Florida
Colonial Revival architecture in Florida
Houses completed in 1937